Nemanja Toroman (born 26 December 2000) is a Serbian professional footballer who plays as a goalkeeper for Vojvodina.

Club career

Vojvodina
On 30 October 2020, Toroman made his first team debut, replacing Goran Vukliš in the 80th minute of a 3–1 home win over OFK Bačka.

Career statistics

Honours
Vojvodina
Serbian Cup: 2019–20

References

External links
 
 
 

Living people
2000 births
Serbian footballers
Association football goalkeepers
FK Vojvodina players
OFK Bačka players
Serbian SuperLiga players
Footballers from Novi Sad